Egino or Egeno may refer to:
Egino, Duke of Thuringia
Egino IV, Count of Urach

Saint Egino, abbot of Augsburg
Egino (bishop of Dalby)

 (1920–2012), German artist

See also 
 Egeno of Konradsburg (disambiguation)